Yurak may refer to:

Yurats language, also known as Yurak
Nenets languages, formerly also known as Yurak
Jeff Yurak (born 1954), American baseball player